Edward Maurice Besly (28 January 1888 - 12 April (?), 1945) was an English composer, conductor, schoolteacher, organist and arranger best known for his popular ballads, The Second Minuet and Time, You Old Gipsy Man. More ambitious vocal pieces were the Four Poems Op 24, Charivaria (5 songs) and his setting of Christina Rossetti's The shepherds had an angel for soprano solo and chorus.

Besly was born in Normanby, Yorkshire, and was educated at Tonbridge School and Caius College, Cambridge. After a short stage career he studied music at the Leipzig Conservatorium under Teichmüller, Schreck and Krehl. From 1912-1914 he was music-master at Tonbridge School, returning there after World War I as Assistant Music Master. In 1919 he  became director of music and organist of Queen’s College, Oxford (1919–1926), and subsequently took over the Oxford Orchestral Society from Sir Hugh Allen. He gave his first concert in London with the London Symphony Orchestra in 1923, and conducted the Royal Albert Hall Orchestra, and the Scottish Orchestra for a portion of the season 1924. He was sometime Director of the Performing Rights Society. In his latter years he worked in legal practice as a solicitor and notary public.

Besly's compositions include orchestral works, songs and ballads, short choral works, piano pieces, and works for violin.  He also composed the musical plays For Ever After, Luana and Khan Zala and edited the Queen’s College Hymn Book. His transcriptions for orchestra include works by Bach, and for piano / organ works by Stravinsky (Firebird suite), Falla (El amor brujo) and Bizet (Carmen). His motet "O Lord, support us," a setting of a prayer by St. John Henry Newman, is still frequently sung in Anglican Cathedrals.

References
Grove Dictionary of Music and Musicians (1952 Edition)
Some British conductor-composers by Philip L. Scowcroft. Part 4 - at Music Web International

1888 births
1945 deaths
People educated at Tonbridge School
Alumni of Gonville and Caius College, Cambridge
English conductors (music)
British male conductors (music)
English classical organists
British male organists
English composers
20th-century organists
20th-century British conductors (music)
20th-century British male musicians
20th-century British musicians
Male classical organists